Joseph Vernon Jones (August 23, 1834 - October 9, 1912) of Urne, Wisconsin was a member of the Wisconsin State Assembly during the 1887 session. Jones represented Buffalo County, Wisconsin. He was a Republican.

References

People from Buffalo County, Wisconsin
1834 births
1912 deaths
Republican Party members of the Wisconsin State Assembly